Amos Wood House is a historic home located near North Landing, Ellisburg in Jefferson County, New York.  The house was built in 1826, and consists of three sections: the main block, ell, and service addition.  The limestone main block is a -story, five bay structure.  The one-story limestone ell has a frame upper structure.  The two-story frame service addition is attached to the ell.  Also on the property is a contributing late-19th century sugar house and early-20th century chicken coop.

It was added to the National Register of Historic Places in 2012.

References

Houses on the National Register of Historic Places in New York (state)
Houses completed in 1826
Houses in Jefferson County, New York
1826 establishments in New York (state)
National Register of Historic Places in Jefferson County, New York